Marta is a  (municipality) in the Province of Viterbo in the Italian region of Latium, located about  northwest of Rome and about  northwest of Viterbo.

Marta borders the following municipalities: Capodimonte, Montefiascone, Tuscania, Viterbo.

Marta is on the southern shore of Lake Bolsena near the source of the Marta River.

References

External links
 Official website 
 Tuscia 360 about Marta with VR panoramas

Cities and towns in Lazio